Kiss the Girls is a 1997 American neo-noir psychological thriller film directed by Gary Fleder and starring Morgan Freeman, Ashley Judd, and Cary Elwes. The screenplay by David Klass is based on James Patterson's best-selling 1995 novel of the same name. A sequel titled Along Came a Spider was released in 2001.

Plot
Washington, D.C. detective and forensic psychologist Alex Cross heads to Durham, North Carolina when his niece Naomi, a college student, is reported missing. He learns from police detective Nick Ruskin that Naomi is the latest in a series of young women who have vanished. Soon after his arrival, one of the missing women is found dead, bound to a tree, and a short time later, Kate McTiernan is kidnapped from her home.

When she awakens from a drugged state, Kate discovers that she is being held by a masked man calling himself Casanova, and she is one of several prisoners trapped in his lair. She manages to escape and is severely injured when she jumps from a cliff into a river. After she recuperates, she joins forces with Cross to track down her captor, whom Cross concludes is a collector, not a killer, unless his victims fail to follow his rules. This means there is time to rescue the other imprisoned women, as long as they remain obedient.

Clues lead them to Los Angeles, where a series of gruesome kidnappings and murders have been credited to Dr. William Rudolph, known as the Gentleman Caller. Cross's efforts to capture and question Rudolph are foiled when Rudolph escapes. In North Carolina, Cross traces Casanova up the river. Alerted by a gunshot, he discovers Casanova's underground hideout. Rudolph is revealed to be Casanova's partner. Casanova escapes, while Rudolph is shot by Cross. Cross rescues the kidnapped women, including Naomi.

Later, Kate invites Cross to dinner at her house. Ruskin drops by Kate's house and sends home the two officers guarding her. While Cross is at home preparing to meet Kate for dinner, he discovers that Ruskin's signature on the arrest warrants matches Casanova's handwriting. Cross tries calling Kate to inform her, but Ruskin has already disconnected her phone line. Kate becomes suspicious of Ruskin while conversing with him. He then drops his accent, revealing he is Casanova. After a fight and attempted rape, Kate manages to handcuff him to the oven. Ruskin slashes Kate's arm with a kitchen knife. In attempting to free himself, Ruskin pulls the oven away from the wall, rupturing the gas pipe. Ruskin takes out a lighter, threatening to cause an explosion due to the leaking gas. Cross shows up and tries to discourage Ruskin. When this fails, Cross shoots Ruskin, firing through a milk carton to avoid igniting the gas. Cross comforts Kate as the police arrive.

Cast

 Morgan Freeman as Dr. / Detective Alex Cross
 Ashley Judd as Dr. Kate McTiernan
 Cary Elwes as Detective Nick Ruskin
 Alex McArthur as Detective Davey Sikes
 Bill Nunn as Detective John Sampson
 Jeremy Piven as Detective Henry Castillo
 Brian Cox as Chief Hatfield
 Jay O. Sanders as FBI Agent Kyle Craig
 Tony Goldwyn as Dr. William Rudolph
 William Converse-Roberts as Dr. Wick Sachs
 Roma Maffia as Dr. Ruocco
 Richard T. Jones as Seth Samuel
 Gina Ravera as Naomi Cross
 Heidi Schanz as Megan Murphy
 Tatyana Ali as Janelle Cross
 Mena Suvari as Coty Pierce
 Anna Maria Horsford as Vickie Cross
 Helen Martin as Nana Maybellene Cross

Production

Filming
Principal photography began on April 16, 1996. The film was shot two weeks on location in North Carolina on the streets of Durham, in nearby county parks, and outside a Chapel Hill, North Carolina residence. The police station was constructed in a downtown Durham warehouse. The majority of filming occurred in the Los Angeles area, with locations including the Disney Ranch, The Athenaeum at the California Institute of Technology in Pasadena, California, a house in the Adams historic district of Los Angeles, and on the campus of the University of Southern California in University Park. Designed by American production designer Nelson Coates, the majority of the sets, including the tunnels and underground chambers, were constructed in sound stages on the Paramount Studios lot. Filming was completed on July 10.

Release
The film premiered at the Deauville Film Festival in September 1997 before opening on 2,271 screens in the US the following month. It earned $13,215,167 in its opening weekend and a total of $60,527,873 in the US, ranking #30 in domestic revenue for the year.

The film was not shown in some theaters in central Virginia at the time of release, due to the unsolved murders of three teenage girls in the area. This decision was out of respect for the families and surrounding communities. The murders were eventually solved and attributed to Richard Evonitz.

Reception

Critical reception
The film received negative reviews and has a "Rotten" rating of 32% on Rotten Tomatoes from 34 reviews with the consensus: "Detective Alex Cross makes his inauspicious cinematic debut in Kiss the Girls, a clunky thriller that offers few surprises".

Stephen Holden of The New York Times said the film "is cut from the same cloth as The Silence of the Lambs, but the piece of material it uses has the uneven shape and dangling threads of a discarded remnant.... [It] begins promisingly, then loses its direction as the demand for accelerated action overtakes narrative logic". Holden writes of Morgan Freeman that he "projects a kindness, patience and canny intelligence that cut against the movie's fast pace and pumped-up shock effects. His performance is so measured it makes you want to believe in the movie much more than its gimmicky jerry-rigged [sic] plot ever permits".

In the Chicago Sun-Times, Roger Ebert gave the film three and a half out of four stars and said, "David Klass, the screenwriter, gives Freeman and Judd more specific dialogue than is usual in thrillers; they sound as if they might actually be talking with each other and not simply advancing plot points.... [They] are so good, you almost wish they'd decided not to make a thriller at all - had simply found a way to construct a drama exploring their personalities".

Rita Kempley of The Washington Post called the film "a tense, scary, perversely creepy thriller" and added that "David Klass ... blessedly deletes the graphic descriptions of torture and rape included in the novel. Unfortunately, he also neglects to include any explanation of Casanova's behavior. Otherwise Kiss the Girls does what it's supposed to do. A solid second film from director Gary Fleder, it's sure to set pulses racing and spines tingling". In the same newspaper, Desson Howe felt that "the movie ... operates on the crime-movie equivalent of automatic pilot. It takes off, flies and lands without much creative intervention".

In the San Francisco Chronicle, Peter Stack thought "the story ... goes on too long. It has too many confusing plot twists and keeps losing energy. Blame it on Hollywood excess, or director Gary Fleder's uncertain hand. A cut of 15 minutes would have helped". He was more impressed by the film's stars, calling Morgan Freeman "compelling" and "a hero of extraordinary power that comes almost entirely from his unemotional, calculating calm", and stating that Ashley Judd "gives the sometimes plodding drama a dose of intense vitality. This young actress is getting awfully good at turning potentially gelatinous characters into substantive people who spark viewer interest".

Awards and nominations
Judd was nominated for Best Supporting Actress in a Motion Picture Drama at the 1998 Satellite Awards.

Sequel and reboot
Four years after Kiss the Girls, a film adaptation of Along Came a Spider was released. Morgan Freeman reprised his role. Later, the franchise was rebooted with a 2012 adaptation of the novel Cross, titled Alex Cross, starring Tyler Perry in the titular role.

References

External links

 
 

1997 films
1997 crime thriller films
1990s psychological thriller films
American crime thriller films
American psychological thriller films
American serial killer films
American thriller drama films
Films about kidnapping
Films based on American novels
Films based on crime novels
Films set in North Carolina
Films shot in North Carolina
Paramount Pictures films
Films directed by Gary Fleder
Films produced by David Brown
American police detective films
Films based on works by James Patterson
Films scored by Mark Isham
Films about rape
1990s English-language films
1990s American films